Time Release is a crime novel by the American writer Martin J. Smith (1956-) set in Pittsburgh, Pennsylvania.

It tells the story of a killer who used pain relief capsules, as well as other techniques, to set off a series of poisonings. It also focuses on repressed memories and if, when and how they will come out. The protagonist is psychologist and memory expert Jim Christensen who tries to solve the case.

Sources
Contemporary Authors Online. The Gale Group, 2006. PEN (Permanent Entry Number):  0000132047.

External links
  Martin J. Smith website

1997 American novels
American crime novels
Novels set in Pittsburgh